Scuderi is a surname. Notable people with the surname include:

 Francesco Scuderi (athlete) (born 1977), sprinter
 Francesco Scuderi (wrestler) 
 Giovanni Scuderi (born 1935), politician
 Joe Scuderi (born 1968), cricketer
 Rob Scuderi (born 1978), ice hockey player
 Sara Scuderi (1906–1987), Italian opera singer

See also
 Mademoiselle de Scuderi, novella
 Scuderi engine, a combustion engine